Pluckemin is an unincorporated community located within Bedminster Township, in Somerset County, New Jersey, United States. It was also known historically as Pluckamin. It was the site of several historic events during the American Revolutionary War.

Demographics

History

After the victory at Princeton, General George Washington and his army camped nearby from January 4 to 6, 1777 on the march to Morristown. On January 5, General Washington set up his headquarters in a local Pluckemin house, which later became known as the John Fenner House, and wrote his battle report to John Hancock. He also ordered military honors for the battle death of British Captain William Leslie, a friend of the American Dr. Benjamin Rush. The gravestone is in the graveyard of the former St. Paul's Lutheran Church (built 1757), where the Pluckemin Presbyterian Church is now located.

During the winter of 1778–79, the Pluckemin Continental Artillery Cantonment Site, commanded by General Henry Knox, was located nearby.

On February 18, 1779, General Knox organized a grand celebration, The French Alliance Ball, for the first anniversary of the alliance with France. In attendance were General Washington and his wife Martha. Over four hundred people enjoyed dancing, drinking and fireworks.

Historic district
The Pluckemin Village Historic District was added to the National Register of Historic Places on July 26, 1982.

Transportation
Pluckemin is intersected by two major roads: U.S. Route 202 / U.S. Route 206 (north-south) and County Route 620 / Burnt Mills Road / Washington Valley Road (east-west).

See also
Pluckemin Continental Artillery Cantonment Site
Pluckemin Village Historic District

References

External links

The Tale of Two Bedminsters including Pluckemin

Bedminster, New Jersey
Unincorporated communities in Somerset County, New Jersey
Unincorporated communities in New Jersey